Unrequited is the fifth album from Loudon Wainwright III. It was his last album on the Columbia Records label, released in 1975. Tracks 1–7 were recorded in a studio, while tracks 8–14 were recorded live at The Bottom Line in New York City. Tracks 15–17 are bonus tracks included on the Sony-Legacy CD reissue.

Although stylistically typical of Wainwright's mid-1970s output, the album is somewhat groundbreaking in that though all songs are originals, one side is studio, the other live.

Track listing
All songs composed by Loudon Wainwright III; except where indicated
"Sweet Nothings" – 2:47
"The Lowly Tourist" – 3:28
"Kings and Queens" (Loudon Wainwright III, George Gerdes) – 2:21
"Kick in the Head" – 2:49
"Whatever Happened to Us" – 2:02
"Crime of Passion" – 3:01
"Absence Makes The Heart Grow Fonder" – 2:28
"On The Rocks" – 3:15
"Guru" – 2:16
"Mr. Guilty" – 3:25
"The Untitled" – 2:58
"Unrequited to the Nth Degree" – 3:59
"Old Friend" – 2:53
"Rufus is a Tit Man" – 2:28
"Rufus is a Tit Man" (Alternate Version) – 2:59
"Over The Hill" (Loudon Wainwright III, Kate McGarrigle) – 2:50
"Hollywood Hopeful" – 2:39

Song information

Studio
Sweet Nothings
Paramount – August 21, 1974
Loudon Wainwright III, Calvin Hardy, Greg Thomas, Frank Kleiger, Ron Colbertson, Randy Wallace, Jon Hall, Marty Grebb, David Sanborn, Chris Guest
Written by Loudon Wainwright III
Produced and arranged by Mark Harmon
The Lowly Tourist
Bearsville – April 5, 1974
Loudon Wainwright III, Harvey Brooks, Marty Grebb, Richard Crooks, Jon Hall, George Gerdes
Written by Loudon Wainwright III
Produced by Loudon Wainwright III and Milton Kramer
Kings and Queens
Paramount – August 22, 1974
Loudon Wainwright III, Klaus Voormann, Jim Keltner, Lyle Ritz, Jay Migliori, Richard Green, Austin de Lone
Written by Loudon Wainwright III and George Gerdes
Produced by Loudon Wainwright III
Kick in the Head
Record Plant, Sausalito, CA – October 9, 1974
Loudon Wainwright III
Written by Loudon Wainwright III
Produced by Loudon Wainwright III
Whatever Happened To Us
Bearsville – June 28, 1974
Loudon Wainwright III, Jon Hall, Marty Grebb, Harvey Brooks, Richard Crooks, Freebo
Written by Loudon Wainwright III
Produced by Loudon Wainwright III and Milton Kramer
Crime of Passion
Paramount – August 22, 1974
Loudon Wainwright III, Jim Keltner, Klaus Voormann, Randy Wallace, Richard Greene, Martin Fierro
Written by Loudon Wainwright III
Produced by Loudon Wainwright III
Absence Makes The Heart Grow Fonder
Columbia, NYC – November 20, 1974
Loudon Wainwright III, Kate and Anna McGarrigle
Written by Loudon Wainwright III
Produced by Loudon Wainwright III

Live at the Bottom Line
Live tracks recorded live at the Bottom Line, remote by Record Plant NYC, August 30, August 31, September 1, 1974. All songs written, performed and produced by Loudon Wainwright III.

Bonus tracks
All songs written by Loudon Wainwright III except for "Over the Hill" written by Loudon Wainwright III and Kate McGarrigle. All songs produced by Loudon Wainwright III

Release history
LP: Columbia PC 33369 (U.S.)
LP: CBS 80696 (UK)
CD: Edsel EDCD273 (1988)
CD: Sony-Legacy 65258 (1998)

References

Loudon Wainwright III albums
1975 albums
Columbia Records albums
Albums recorded at the Bottom Line